Yinghuangia aomiensis is a Gram-positive, aerobic bacterium species from the genus Yinghuangia which was isolated from soil from Aomi in Tokyo in Japan.

See also 
 List of Streptomyces species

References

Further reading

External links
Type strain of Streptomyces aomiensis at BacDive -  the Bacterial Diversity Metadatabase

Streptomycineae
Bacteria described in 2011